Notre Dame High School is a private, Roman Catholic high school in Riverside, California. It is located across the street from Saint Catherine of Alexandria Catholic Church at the corner of Brockton Avenue and Arlington Avenue. It is part of the Roman Catholic Diocese of San Bernardino.

Background
Notre Dame is a secondary school founded in 1956 by the Most Reverend Charles F. Buddy, Bishop of the Diocese of San Diego, as a Diocesan secondary school for boys. The first principal was Reverend J.V. Sullivan, a Diocesan priest. In 1957, the administration of the school was taken over by the Holy Ghost Fathers, who staffed Notre Dame until 1970, at which time plans were drawn up to merge Notre Dame with St. Francis de Sales Girls High School. Notre Dame became a co-ed school at the start of the school year, in September 1972, under the direction of the Most Reverend Leo T. Maher, Bishop of the Diocese of San Diego.

In 1978, the Diocese of San Diego was divided and the new Diocese of San Bernardino was created with the Most Reverend Philip F. Straling as its first Bishop.

Notable alumni
 Kenjon Barner, running back for the Los Angeles Chargers, Philadelphia Eagles
 Will Smith, linebacker for the Dallas Cowboys
 Marvin Cobb, safety for the Cincinnati Bengals 1975-1979
 Michael Huerta, administrator of the Federal Aviation Agency since January 2013 for a 5-year term
Patricia Lock Dawson, Mayor of Riverside, California

Notes and references

External links
 

Articles needing additional references from February 2018
All articles needing additional references
Catholic secondary schools in California
Educational institutions established in 1956
High schools in Riverside, California
1956 establishments in California